Edestus is an extinct genus of edestoid cartilaginous fish known from the Late Carboniferous (Pennsylvanian) of the United Kingdom, Russia, and the United States. Most remains consist of isolated curved blades or "whorls" that are studded with teeth, that in life were situated within the jaws. Edestus is a Greek name derived from the word edeste (to devour), in reference to the aberrant quality and size of the species' teeth. The largest species, E. heinrichi, has been conservatively estimated to reach greater than 6.7 m (22 ft) in length, around the size of the largest known great white shark.

Like its other relatives, such as Helicoprion, and unlike modern sharks, the species of Edestus grew teeth in curved blades or "whorls". In Edestus' case, only a single row of teeth occurred in the midline of each jaw, leading Edestus to sometimes be described as the "scissor tooth shark". The degree of curvature in the teeth brackets, along with size, are distinct in each species.

History of discovery 
Edestus was first described by Joseph Leidy in 1856. The type species is Edestus vorax, the holotype specimen (ANSP 9899) is very fragmentary and of uncertain stratigraphic and geographic provenance, reported to be from Muskogee County, Oklahoma, though this has been questioned. In 1855 Edward Hitchcock presented a specimen of Edestus to the American Association for the Advancement of Science meeting at Providence, Rhode Island the specimen (a tooth whorl) had been originally found in Parke County, Indiana. The specimen was loaned to famed British anatomist Richard Owen in 1861, who referred the specimen to Edestus and suggested that it was a fin spine. Edestus minor was described in 1866 by John Strong Newberry based on AMNH FF477, a single crown that lacks most of the root from Posey County, Indiana. Edestus heinrichi was described in 1870 by Newberry and Amos Henry Worthen from a now-lost specimen found in Illinois. Edestus triserratus was described in 1904 by Edwin Tulley Newton, from GSM 31410, which was found in the Coal Measures in Staffordshire, England which is a partial tooth lacking the apex of the crown. Oliver Perry Hay in 1912 was the first to describe an associated pair of upper and lower tooth whorls (USNM V7255), found in a coal mine near Lehigh, Iowa, which he assigned to the new species Edestus mirus, now thought to be a synonym of Edestus minor. Specimens of Edestus are also known from the Moscow Basin on the Russian Platform. Edestus karpinskii was described by A.B. Missuna in 1908 from remains found near Kolomna around 100 km southeast of Moscow. Edestus minusculus was described by Hay in 1912 from a specimen originally described by Alexander Karpinsky as Edestus cf. minor from a specimen found at the Myachkova quarry, near Moscow.

Description 
The whorls of Edestus are composed of numerous serrated teeth that have long v-shaped roots that are stacked on top of each other akin to roof tiling. Up to a dozen teeth are present in each whorl at any one time. Teeth grew in the back end (posterior) of the whorl, and gradually migrated forward through the whorl, before being ejected at the front end (anterior). Up to 40 teeth could have grown in each whorl during the lifetime of the animal. The upper and lower whorls are distinct in their morphology, with the lower whorl having a greater degree of curvature.As with most cartilaginous fish, preserved skeletal material is rare, due to the cartilage of the skeleton having a poor potential for fossilisation. Several specimens with the preserved cranial remains of Edestus have been reported, the most important being FMNH PF2204, a crushed juvenile specimen, likely representative of E. heinrichi, which preserves both upper and lower blades in association with a well preserved chondrocranium and jaws. The Meckel's cartilage of the lower jaw is approximately 1.5 times the length of the lower whorl, the end of the lower whorl extends forward beyond the edge of the Meckel's cartiilage. The Meckel's cartilage was articulated with a slender quadrate via a socket in the Meckel's cartilage which articlulated with a process of the quadrate. The quadrate at its other end articulated with the otic process of the chondrocranium, the structure that houses the brain and sensory organs. The upper tooth blade was rigidly held between two plates of palatine cartilage, which at their front ends are crescent shaped, matching the curvature of the tooth whorl, with the upper whorl extending forward beyond the cartilage. The chondrocranium was capped by a shield-shaped dorsal plate.

No postcranial remains are known of Edestus. However, poscranial remains are known for other eugeneodont genera. Eugeneodonts with preserved postcrania include the Pennsylvanian to Triassic-age caseodontoids Caseodus, Fadenia, and Romerodus. These taxa have a fusiform (streamlined, torpedo-shaped) body plan, with triangular pectoral fins. There is a single large and triangular dorsal fin without a fin spine, and a tall, forked caudal fin which externally appears to be homocercal (with two equally-sized lobes). This general body plan is shared by active, open-water predatory fish such as tuna, swordfish, and lamnid sharks. Eugeneodonts also lack pelvic and anal fins, and judging by Romerodus, they would have had broad keels along the side of the body up to the caudal fin. Fadenia had five well-exposed gill slits, possibly with a vestigial sixth gill. There is no evidence of the specialized gill basket and fleshy operculum present in living chimaeroids.

The cranium of FMNH PF2204 is around 25 centimetres in length, and the associated upper and lower whorls have lengths of 10.4 and 8 cm respectively. The largest known individuals of E. heinrichi are an upper whorl 32 cm in length and a lower whorl 43 cm in length. The estimated minimum length of the skulls of these individuals based on allometry are around 77 cm and 134 cm respectively. Based on a 5:1 body length to head ratio, this suggests that individuals of E. heinrichi could reach lengths of 6.7 m.

Paleobiology 
Due to the unusual nature of the tooth whorls and the historic lack of cranial material, many hypotheses for how the whorls functioned have been proposed. Early hypotheses suggested that they were indeed teeth or were defensive spines located on the fins. Wayne M. Itano proposed that the whorls were arranged vertically to slash prey. In the description of the cranial material of Edestus, Tapanila and colleagues (2018) found that the tooth whorls functioned as effective grasping and slicing tools for soft bodied prey. The jaws of Edestus were operated by a two gear system, involving double jointing of the quadrate bone allowing for forward and backward movement of the lower jaw, similar to the streptostyly seen in living squamates, with an estimated force ouput of 1907 newtons. The authors proposed that during prey approach, adductor muscles pulled the Meckel's cartilage of the lower jaw upwards and forwards to close the jaw, causing each tooth to slice roughly three times its length, and further push the prey into the teeth of the upper whorl. During the subsequent opening of the jaw mouth the Meckel's cartilage moved backwards and downwards by the adductor muscles, causing further slicing.

Species and distribution

13 species of Edestus have been named, but in a 2019 morphometric analysis only 4 were considered valid, which span a six million year interval in the Late Carboniferous (313-307 million years ago). Species of Edestus are divided into two groups, those which have asymmetrical crowns that slant forwards, and those with symmetrical ones. The earliest known species are from the late Bashkirian of the United Kingdom, with the first appearances in Russia and the United States during the Moscovian, corresponding to a rise in sea level. These localities were situated in paleoequatorial tropical latitudes. Most remains of Edestus are found in marine shales that overlie coal swamp deposits as a result of marine transgression events.

Asymmetric crowns
E. triserratus Newton, 1904  (syn Edestus minusculus Hay, 1909, Edestodus kolomnensis (Lebedev, 2001)) Late Bashkirian to Moscovian, United States, United Kingdom and Russia distinguished by having obtuse triangular crowns that narrow to a "bullet shaped" apex, the denticles are fine and the root is proportionally longer than E. minor upper whorl has a massive straight base, while the lower whorl is slender and more tightly curved.
E. minor Newberry in Newberry and Worthen, 1866  (syn E. mirus Hay, 1912 E. pringlei Watson, 1930) Late Bashkirian to Moscovian, United States and United Kingdom distinguished from other species by obtuse tapered crowns with fine denticles and a strongly curved lower whorl
Symmetric crowns
E. heinrichi Newberry and Worthen, 1870  (syn E. protopirata Trautschold, 1879, Protopirata centrodon Trautschold, 1888, E. karpinskyi Missuna, 1908, E. crenulatus Hay, 1909, E. serratus Hay, 1909) Moscovian of the United States and Russia, distinguished by having crowns with an acute triangular shape, with a slightly longer posterior than anterior edge, coarse denticles, and long and straight roots in the upper whorl, slightly curved in the lower whorl
E. vorax Leidy, 1856 (syn E. giganteus Newberry, 1889) Moscovian of the United States distinguished by crowns with acute triangular shape, a slightly longer posterior edge, very coarse denticles, stout roots that extend deep beneath the tooth crown, and intermediate apex angle
Edestus newtoni, described by Arthur Smith Woodward in 1916 from the "Millstone Grit" of Yorkshire, United Kingdom, has a much greater curvature of the whorl than other species of Edestus, and has sometimes been placed in its own genus Lestrodus. A placement in a separate genus is supported by its lack of a convex bulge opposite the tooth crowns, which is present on all other species of Edestus.

References

 Elasmo Research

Edestidae
Prehistoric cartilaginous fish genera
Carboniferous cartilaginous fish
Pennsylvanian fish of North America
Carboniferous fish of Europe